The Perkow reaction is an organic reaction in which a trialkyl phosphite ester reacts with a haloketone to form a dialkyl vinyl phosphate and an alkyl halide.

In the related Michaelis–Arbuzov reaction the same reactants are known to form a beta-keto phosphonate which is an important reagent in the Horner–Wadsworth–Emmons reaction on the road to alkenes. The Perkow reaction, in this respect is considered a side-reaction.

Reaction mechanism 
The reaction mechanism of the Perkow reaction consists of a nucleophilic addition of the phosphite at the carbonyl carbon forming a zwitterionic intermediate. The zwitterionic intermediate rearranges to a cationic species while eliminating the halide. The cationic species then dealkylates through a second nucleophilic displacement in which the halide anion attacks one of the phosphite alkoxide substituents forming an enol phosphate.

Scope 
The Perkow reaction has been applied in the synthesis of an insect repellent based on hexachloroacetone and triethylphosphite which is able to engage in a secondary [4+3] cycloaddition with furan through the action of the base sodium 2,2,2-trifluoroethoxide. The authors report mediocre yields. 

The Perkow reaction is also used in the synthesis of novel quinolines. When the substituent is n-butyl the reaction product is the classical Perkow adduct. In this reaction the leaving group is an electron deficient acyl group (owing to the presence of three fluorine groups). When the substituent on the other hand is phenyl (not shown) the phosphite has a preference for reaction with the acyl group leading to an ethyl enol ether. Key in explaining the difference in reactivity is the electron density on the α-keto carbon atom.

Aryl enol phosphates formed in good yields (ca. 90%) in the Perkow reaction can be used as phosphorylating reagents, e.g. able to transform AMP into ATP.

References 

  Perkow, W. Chemische Berichte 1954, 87, 755–758
  Hexachloroacetone as a Precursor for a Tetrachloro-substituted Oxyallyl Intermediate: [4+3] Cycloaddition to Cyclic 1,3-Dienes Baldur Föhlisch and Stefan Reiner Molecules 2004, 9, 1–10 Online Article
  New Modification of the Perkow Reaction: Halocarboxylate Anions as Leaving Groups in 3-Acyloxyquinoline-2,4(1H,3H)-dione Compounds Oldrich Paleta, Karel Pomeisl, Stanislav Kafka, Antonin Klasek, Vladislav Kubelka Beilstein Journal of Organic Chemistry 2005 Online Article
  T. Moriguchi, K. Okada, K. Seio, and M. Sekine. "Synthesis and Stability of 1-Phenylethenyl Phosphate Derivatives and their Phosphoryl Transfer Activity", Letters in Organic Chemistry, 1 (2):140–144, 2004

Substitution reactions

Name reactions